Katherine Gwen Mudge (16 August 1881 – 26 July 1975) was a British archer.  She competed at the 1908 Summer Olympics in London. She was born in Llanbedr, Gwynedd in Wales and was a member of the Devon and Cornwall Archery Society. Mudge competed at the 1908 Games in the only archery event open to women, the double National round.  She took 17th place in the event with 465 points.

Her married name was Cardale. She died in Stratton in Cornwall on 26 July 1975.

References

Sources
 
 

1881 births
1975 deaths
Sportspeople from Gwynedd
Archers at the 1908 Summer Olympics
Olympic archers of Great Britain
British female archers
Welsh female archers
20th-century British women